Robin Anderson and Jessika Ponchet were the defending champions but both players chose not to participate.

Michaela Bayerlová and Jang Su-jeong won the title, defeating Elysia Bolton and Jamie Loeb in the final, 6–3, 6–2.

Seeds

Draw

Draw

References

External Links
Main Draw

Tevlin Women's Challenger - Doubles